Woodland is an unincorporated community in Marion County, in the U.S. state of Missouri.

History
A post office called Woodland was established in 1872, and remained in operation until 1941. The community was named after a nearby private estate of the same name.

References

Unincorporated communities in Marion County, Missouri
Unincorporated communities in Missouri